Circaea × dubia is a hybrid of flowering plants in the evening primrose family Onagraceae. The parents of the hybrid are Circaea cordata and Circaea erubescens.

References

dubia
Plant nothospecies